A Dog, a Mouse and a Sputnik is a 1958 French comedy film.

It was also known as Hold That Satellite or À pied, à cheval et en spoutnik !.

References

External links

Review at The New York Times
Film page at Le Film Guide
film page at Uni France

1958 films
1958 comedy films
French comedy films
Films about space programs
1950s French-language films
1950s French films